René Dignon (born 1894, date of death unknown) was a French modern pentathlete. He competed at the 1924 Summer Olympics.

References

External links
 

1894 births
Year of death unknown
French male modern pentathletes
Olympic modern pentathletes of France
Modern pentathletes at the 1924 Summer Olympics